Bredemeyera is a genus of flowering plants belonging to the family Polygalaceae.

Its native range is Southern Mexico to Tropical America.

Species  

Bredemeyera atlantica 
Bredemeyera barbeyana 
Bredemeyera bracteata 
Bredemeyera brevifolia 
Bredemeyera confusa 
Bredemeyera cuneata 
Bredemeyera densiflora 
Bredemeyera disperma 
Bredemeyera divaricata 
Bredemeyera floribunda 
Bredemeyera hebeclada 
Bredemeyera isabelliana 
Bredemeyera laurifolia 
Bredemeyera lucida 
Bredemeyera martiana 
Bredemeyera moritziana 
Bredemeyera myrtifolia 
Bredemeyera petiolata

References

Polygalaceae
Fabales genera